Ivan Levačić (born 25 August 1931) is a former Yugoslav cyclist. He competed in the individual road race and team time trial events at the 1960 Summer Olympics. Levacic was born in Karlovac, his professions is a repairman.

References

External links
 

1931 births
Living people
Yugoslav male cyclists
Olympic cyclists of Yugoslavia
Cyclists at the 1960 Summer Olympics
People from Virje